Jerry Snell (April 17, 1957 in Vancouver, British Columbia – August 7, 2015 in Bangkok, Thailand) was a Canadian actor.

Filmography 
 1987: Night Zoo (Un zoo la nuit) : American
 1991: Nelligan : Marin
 1992 : "Exit pour nomades" : "Pierre Bastien"
 1992: L'Automne sauvage : John Kendall
 1993: Map of the Human Heart : Boleslaw
 1993: Matusalem : Voyou du village
 1995: Motel : Mat
 2001: February 15, 1839 (15 février 1839) : Lewis Harkin

References

External links

1957 births
2015 deaths
Canadian male film actors
Canadian male television actors
Canadian male stage actors
Male actors from Vancouver
20th-century Canadian male actors
21st-century Canadian male actors